Dendrobium clementsii, commonly known as the Cape York crimp orchid, is a species of epiphytic or lithophytic orchid that is endemic to tropical North Queensland, Australia. It has long stems, tapering pseudobulbs each with a thin, leathery dark green leaf and clusters of short-lived, cream-coloured flowers with a purple labellum.

Description
Flowering occurs sporadically throughout the year and the flowers last less than a day.

Taxonomy and naming
The Cape York crimp orchid was first formally described in 2004 by David Jones who gave it the name Flickingeria clementsii, published in The Orchadian. In 2014, Julian Mark Hugh Shaw changed the name to Dendrobium clementsii.

Distribution and habitat
The Cape York crimp orchid grows on rocks and trees in rainforest on the Iron and McIlwraith Ranges on the Cape York Peninsula.

References

clementsii
Orchids of Queensland
Endemic orchids of Australia
Plants described in 2004